Doctor Clayton Forrester is a fictional character in George Pal's 1953 science fiction film The War of the Worlds, the first film adaptation of the H. G. Wells 1898 novel of the same name. The Forrester character is played by  actor Gene Barry.

The film takes several liberties with the novel's source material. Rather than taking place in early 20th century England, the film is set in mid-20th century southern California. Dr. Clayton Forrester is the film's main character, taking up the role assumed by two (unnamed) brothers in Wells' original novel.

Forrester is an astro and nuclear physicist on a fishing vacation with friends when he gets caught up in an invasion from Mars, as well as falling in love with Ann Robinson's Sylvia Van Buren character. As the Martians attempt to wipe out humanity and take over the world for themselves, Forrester is one of the few scientists who attempts to find a biological weakness in the aliens. When he fails, and mankind faces extinction, the Martians succumb to common Earthly microorganisms, against which they have no defense, as in Wells' novel.

Both Gene Barry and Ann Robinson have a cameo in Steven Spielberg's 2005 remake, as a homage to the original George Pal 1953 film.

War of the Worlds television series
The War of the Worlds TV series (developed as a direct sequel to the film, not the original H. G. Wells novel) makes a number of references to Dr. Clayton Forrester, but does not actually feature the character. The show's back-story establishes that Forrester adopted a young boy, Harrison Blackwood, who was orphaned during the Martian invasion in the film. (Blackwood's parents were Forrester's colleagues at Pacific Tech). Forrester's discovery that the aliens, believed to have been killed by common bacteria and viruses, were still alive, has led to his professional downfall, but Blackwood has assumed his role as leader of the new fight against the Martian invaders. Forrester's research is occasionally mentioned and proves useful at times throughout the ensuing battles with the aliens. There is also frequent mention of an "Ezekiel Project" that Forrester was in charge of, though nothing about this secret project is really revealed.

Harrison's statement in the first season that Sylvia Van Buren, Forrester's love interest in the film, was practically a mother to him implies that Forrester and Van Buren never married (she is even referred to as "Ms. Van Buren"), and speaks of their relationship as though the two were nothing more than professional work associates. This conflicts with a second-season episode in which Harrison refers to her as "Mrs. Forrester" and includes a scene with a young Harrison in the same household as Sylvia. Because of other conflicting information presented in the show's second season, this isn't necessarily considered canonical.

Though absent from the series, Forrester is integrated into the novelization of the pilot episode. In it, after the Blackwood Project has been formed and begins their efforts, Forrester himself is given a rejuvenated lease on life, only to suffer a fatal heart attack. However, Dr. Blackwood later states in the early episode "Thy Kingdom Come" that Sylvia's mental collapse transpired after Forrester's death, indicating that he had died quite some time before the TV series began.

See also

 Dr. Clayton Forrester, a character on the television series Mystery Science Theater 3000, named after the War of the Worlds character
 Jay Wright Forrester, cutting edge scientist at the time of the movie's production.
 Dr. Clay Forester, lead character in Jack Williamson's 1949 Novel "The Humanoids"

External links
 

Fictional characters from California
Fictional scientists
The War of the Worlds
Film characters introduced in 1953
Science fiction film characters